Pseudocercophora is a genus of fungi within the Lasiosphaeriaceae family. This is a monotypic genus, containing the single species Pseudocercophora ingoldii.

References

External links
Pseudocercophora at Index Fungorum

Lasiosphaeriaceae
Monotypic Sordariomycetes genera